Wat Suwan Khiri, also spelled Wat Suwan Keree is an ancient Thai Buddhist temple in Thonburi side of Bangkok.

The temple is formerly and still colloquially known as "Wat Khi Lek" (วัดขี้เหล็ก) owing to a lot of growth edible plants Siamese cassia (Senna siamea) or khi lek in Thai language.

It was built in the end of King Narai's reign of Ayutthaya period around 1685. The interesting point of this temple is its location, it is located on the bank where two canals confluence were Khlong Bangkok Noi and Khlong Chak Phra, which is unsuitable position according to the beliefs of Thai people since ancient times. Hence, the temple therefore had to bring a standing Buddha image in attitude of pacifying the ocean enshrined in a pavilion at this area there to protect the temple from all evils.

In the Rattanakosin period, Prince Maha Sura Singhanat (younger brother of King Rama I) renovated the whole temple and renamed to "Wat Suwan Khiri" (golden mountain temple) in the year 1795.

On October 22, 1929, King Prajadhipok (Rama VII) presided over the private Kathin ceremony.

References

Bangkok Noi district
Buddhist temples in Bangkok
Unregistered ancient monuments in Bangkok
Religious buildings and structures completed in 1685
17th-century Buddhist temples